Kak is an Indian name (Kashmiri Brahmin surname) for a community originated in Kashmir. It is a subgroup of Saraswat Brahmin-Pandits of India's Kashmir valley.

References 

Indian names
Indian surnames
Surnames of Indian origin
Kashmiri-language surnames
Hindu surnames
Kashmiri tribes
Kashmiri Pandits
Kashmiri Hindus
Kashmiri Brahmins